Clistopyga is a genus of ichneumon wasps in the family Ichneumonidae. There are at least 30 described species in Clistopyga.

Species
, approximately fifty Clistopyga species have been described, thirty of which are found in the Neotropical region. Species include:

 Clistopyga africana Benoit, 1956 c g
 Clistopyga albovittata Bordera, Palacio & Martinez, 2019
 Clistopyga alutaria Townes, 1960 c g
 Clistopyga amazonica Bordera & Sääksjärvi, 2016 g
 Clistopyga arctica Kusigemati, 1985 c g
 Clistopyga atrata Cushman, 1921 c g
 Clistopyga calixtoi Gauld, 1991 c g
 Clistopyga canadensis Provancher, 1880 c g
 Clistopyga caramba Castillo & Saaksjarvi, 2015 g
 Clistopyga carvajali Gauld, Ugalde & Hanson, 1998 c g
 Clistopyga chaconi Gauld, 1991 c g
 Clistopyga crassicaudata 
 Clistopyga diazi Porter, 1979 c g
 Clistopyga eldae Gauld, 1991 c g
 Clistopyga emphera Kusigemati, 1985 c g
 Clistopyga fernandezi Gauld, 1991 c g
 Clistopyga henryi Gauld, 1991 c g
 Clistopyga incitator (Fabricius, 1793) c g
 Clistopyga jakobii Graf, 1985 c g
 Clistopyga laevis Kasparyan, 1981 c g
 Clistopyga lapacensis Bordera, Palacio & Martinez, 2019
 Clistopyga latifrontalis (Uchida, 1941) c g
 Clistopyga linearis (Wollaston, 1858) c g
 Clistopyga longifemoralis Varga & Reshchikov g
 Clistopyga lopezrichinii (Blanchard, 1941) c g
 Clistopyga maculifrons Cushman, 1921 c g
 Clistopyga manni Cushman, 1921 c g
 Clistopyga moraviae Gauld, Ugalde & Hanson, 1998 c g
 Clistopyga nagatomii Kusigemati, 1985 c g
 Clistopyga nigrifrons Cushman, 1921 c g
 Clistopyga plana Morley, 1914 c g
 Clistopyga recurva (Say, 1835) c g b
 Clistopyga rufator Holmgren, 1856 c g
 Clistopyga rugulosa Kusigemati, 1985 c g
 Clistopyga sauberi Brauns, 1898 c g
 Clistopyga speculata Bordera, Palacio & Martinez, 2019
 Clistopyga stanfordi Gauld, 1991 c g
 Clistopyga sziladyi Kiss, 1959 c g

Data sources: i = ITIS, c = Catalogue of Life, g = GBIF, b = Bugguide.net

References

Further reading

External links

 

Pimplinae